The 2015–16 Cleveland State Vikings men's basketball team represented Cleveland State University in the 2015–16 NCAA Division I men's basketball season. Their head coach was Gary Waters in his tenth season. The Vikings were members of the Horizon League and played their home games at the Wolstein Center with five home games at Quicken Loans Arena. It was the 85th season of Cleveland State basketball. They finished the season 9–23, 4–14 in Horizon League play to finish in ninth place. They lost in the first round of the Horizon League tournament to Green Bay.

Roster

Schedule

|-
!colspan=9 style="background:#003300; color:#FFFFFF;"| Non-Conference regular season

|-
!colspan=9 style="background:#003300; color:#FFFFFF;"| Horizon League regular season

|-
!colspan=9 style="background:#003300; color:#FFFFFF;"|Horizon League tournament

References

Cleveland State Vikings Men's
Cleveland State Vikings men's basketball seasons
Cleveland State Vikings men's b
Cleveland State Vikings men's b